Gamal Salie Lineveldt (8 February 1919 – 9 July 1941), also known as Gamut Linneveld, was a South African rapist and serial killer responsible for the "Cape Flats Murders", in which 4 European women were raped and then bludgeoned to death from October to November 1940. Lineveldt was later hanged for his crimes.

Gamal was the son of Naserola Lineveldt and Gadidga Lineveldt.

See also
List of serial killers by country

References

1919 births
1941 deaths
20th-century executions by South Africa
Executed South African serial killers
Male serial killers
People convicted of murder by South Africa
People executed by South Africa by hanging
South African people convicted of murder
South African rapists
Violence against women in South Africa